Piotta may refer to:

Piotta (musician)
Piotta, Switzerland, in the municipality of Quinto, canton of Ticino